Bishnupur is one of the 60 constituencies of the Manipur Legislative Assembly. It is one of the 32 constituencies forming the parliamentary constituency of Inner Manipur.

Members of the Legislative Assembly

Election results

2022 result

2017 result

See also
 List of constituencies of the Manipur Legislative Assembly
 Bishnupur district

References

External link
 

Bishnupur district
Assembly constituencies of Manipur